Ivan Smith may refer to:

 Iván Smith (Argentine footballer) (born 1999), Argentine footballer
 Ivan Smith (Australian footballer) (born 1933), Australian rules footballer
 Ivan Smith (mathematician) (born 1973), British mathematician
 Ivan Smith (politician)